SSCC may refer to

Serial Shipping Container Code maintained by GS1
Silver State Classic Challenge, an Open Road Racing event in Nevada
Siren Song of the Counter Culture, an album by Rise Against
Smurfit-Stone Container
Songshan Cultural and Creative Park, a multi-functional park in Taipei, Taiwan
Southern State Community College in Ohio
Sulphide stress corrosion cracking